Hilal Baladiat Chelghoum Laïd, known as HB Chelghoum Laïd or simply HBCL for short, is an Algerian football club located in Chelghoum Laïd in Mila Province. The club was founded in 1945 and its team's colours are white and Green. Their home stadium, 11 December 1961 Stadium, has a capacity of some 10,000 spectators. The club is currently playing in the Algerian Ligue Professionnelle 1.

On August 5, 2020, HB Chelghoum Laïd promoted to the Algerian Ligue 2.

On July 18, 2021, HB Chelghoum Laïd promoted to the Algerian Ligue Professionnelle 1.

Players
Algerian teams are limited to two foreign players. The squad list includes only the principal nationality of each player;

Current squad
.

Personnel

Current technical staff

References

External links

Football clubs in Algeria
Association football clubs established in 1945
1945 establishments in Algeria
Sports clubs in Algeria